Q and Z signals are brevity codes widely used in Morse code radio telegraphy. See, respectively:
 Q code
 Z code